Anastasia Andreyevna Kulikova (born 15 February 2000) is a Russian-born tennis player who is competing for Finland.

Kulikova has a career-high singles ranking by the WTA of 179, achieved on 13 June 2022. She also has a career-high WTA doubles ranking of 581, reached on 9 August 2021. Kulikova has won eight singles and two doubles titles on the ITF Women's Circuit.

On the ITF Junior Circuit, she has a career-high combined ranking of 69, achieved on 8 January 2018.

Kulikova made her Fed Cup debut for Finland in 2019.

At the 2022 French Open, she upset top qualifying seed Anastasia Potapova in the second round. She failed to qualify into the main draw falling to Ysaline Bonaventure in the third round of the qualifying competition.

Grand Slam performance

Singles

ITF Circuit finals

Singles: 15 (8 titles, 7 runner–ups)

Doubles: 8 (2 titles, 6 runner–ups)

References

External links
 
 
 
 

2000 births
Living people
Russian female tennis players
Finnish female tennis players
Finnish people of Russian descent
Sportspeople from Ryazan